Robert Carmody was the head football coach at Georgetown University (1894) and at Fordham University (1897). He compiled an overall record of 6–6–1.

Head coaching record

References

Year of birth missing
Year of death missing
Fordham Rams football coaches
Georgetown Hoyas football coaches